Fort Gibson National Cemetery is a United States National Cemetery located inside of the town of Fort Gibson, in Muskogee County, Oklahoma. It encompasses , and as of 2021 had more than 25,000 interments.

History

Fort Gibson was established in 1833, on a plot of land within the Cherokee nation. It is at what is considered to be the end of the Trail of Tears. Frontier life was hard, yellow fever was common, and at least three separate cemeteries were created between 1833 and 1857 when the Fort was abandoned.

In 1863 the Fort was remanned by Brigadier General James G. Blunt. In 1868 the National Cemetery was established in a  plot, and all of the nearby cemeteries had their interments transferred to it. This included the remains of many civilians.

Fort Gibson National Cemetery was placed on the National Register of Historic Places on May 20, 1999.

Noteworthy monuments
 A cenotaph to Corporal John Haddo, Medal of Honor recipient for action in Montana Territory during the Indian Wars who is buried in a mass grave in Custer National Cemetery.

Notable interments
 Medal of Honor recipients
 John Haddoo (1851–1877), Indian Wars (cenotaph)
 First Lieutenant Jack C. Montgomery (1917–2002), recipient for action in World War II
 Private First Class John N. Reese Jr. (1923–1945), recipient for action in World War II
 Others
 Captain Sonuk Mikko (Billy Bowlegs) (c. 1810–1859), Seminole who fought for the Union in the American Civil War
 Paul "Buddy" Burris (1923–2007), professional football player
 Joel Elliott (1840–1868), Civil War soldier and officer
 Benjamin Paddock (1926–1998), FBI 10-most wanted criminal in the 1960s, father of Stephen Paddock (1953–2017), who was responsible for the 2017 Las Vegas shooting
 Theodore M. Risenhoover (1934–2006), United States Congressman
 Vivia Thomas (?–1870), figure of a local legend that she was the daughter of a wealthy Boston family, and that she was abandoned at the wedding altar by a soldier who was assigned to Fort Gibson. She disguised herself as a man so she could pass as a soldier and travelled to the Fort alone, confronted him and killed him. She later died of pneumonia that she was said to have contracted while repeatedly braving cold and harsh weather to visit his grave site.

See also
 Sam Houston – regarding Houston's wife, Talahina, who is buried here.

References

External links
 National Cemetery Administration
 Fort Gibson National Cemetery
 Kansas Territory: Frontier Military Scenic Byway
 
 

Cemeteries in Oklahoma
Protected areas of Muskogee County, Oklahoma
United States national cemeteries
Indian Territory in the American Civil War